Widespread censorship of Wikipedia has occurred in countries including (but not limited to) China, Iran, Myanmar, Pakistan, Russia, Saudi Arabia, Syria, Tunisia, Turkey, Uzbekistan, and Venezuela. Some instances are examples of widespread internet censorship in general that includes Wikipedia content. Others are indicative of measures to prevent the viewing of specific content deemed offensive. The length of different blocks have varied from hours to years. When Wikipedia ran on the HTTP protocol, governments were able to block specific articles. However, in 2011 Wikipedia began running on HTTPS as well and in 2015 switched over entirely. Since then, the only censorship options have been to block the entire site for a particular language or prosecute editors, which has resulted in some countries dropping their bans and others expanding their bans to the entire site.

Widespread censorship of Wikipedia

Types of censorship

Blocking all Wikipedia sites (in one or every language) 
Some countries continue to block Wikipedia for long periods of time (e.g. China). Other countries use widespread blocks for shorter periods of time such as several months (e.g. Syria) to just hours (e.g. Pakistan).

Blocking specific types of articles 
Many countries block a range of articles on sensitive topics, such as ideas espoused by a political opposition party such as those about current events (e.g. Russia) or ideas that are against the religious tradition of a regime (e.g. Iran).

Prosecuting editors 

These prosecutions tend to focus on editors who publish information that the government (e.g. Saudi Arabia) wants to censor, leading to self-censorship.

Prosecuting readers 
Few or no reports of government mass surveillance of Wikipedia usage are known since Wikipedia switched over to HTTPS in 2015. However, some governments and companies have installed mass surveillance spyware applications on user equipment, which may detect the usage of VPN software and record visited URLs. This can hypothetically be utilized to eavesdrop Wikipedia browsing. Legal code may deter people from accessing the sites due to the threat of fines, imprisonment, loss of job or physical harm.

By country

Belarus 
On 11 March 2022, Belarusian political police GUBOPiK arrested and detained Mark Bernstein, an editor of the Russian Wikipedia from Minsk, who was editing the Wikipedia article about the Russian invasion of Ukraine, accusing him of the "spread of anti-Russian materials" and of violating Russian "fake news" laws.

On 7 April 2022, a court in Brest sentenced Wikipedia user Pavel Pernikaŭ to two years of prison for three edits of Russian and Belarusian Wikipedia. He was found guilty in "discreditation of the Republic of Belarus" (article 369-1 of the Criminal Code of Belarus).

China 

Access to Wikipedia has varied over the years with the Chinese language version being controlled more tightly than other versions. As of April 2019, all versions of Wikipedia are blocked in Mainland China under the Great Firewall.

The Chinese Wikipedia was launched in May 2001. Wikipedia received positive coverage in China's state press in early 2004 but was blocked on 3 June 2004, ahead of the 15th anniversary of the 1989 Tiananmen Square protests. Proposals to practice self-censorship in a bid to restore the site were rejected by the Chinese Wikipedia community. However, a story by the International Herald Tribune comparing entries on the Chinese and English Wikipedias on topics such as Mao Zedong and Taiwan concluded that the Chinese entries were "watered down and sanitized" of political controversy. On 22 June 2004, access to Wikipedia was restored without explanation. Wikipedia was blocked again for unknown reasons in September but only for four days. Wikipedia was again blocked in China in October 2005. Wikipedia users Shi Zhao and Cui Wei wrote letters to technicians and authorities in an attempt to convince them to unblock the website. Part of the letter read, "By blocking Wikipedia, we lose a chance to present China's voice to the world, allowing evil cults, Taiwan independence forces and others... to present a distorted image of China."

In October 2006, The New York Times reported that the English Wikipedia was unblocked in China, although the Chinese Wikipedia remained blocked. New media researcher Andrew Lih blogged that he could not read the English-language article on the Tiananmen Square protests of 1989 in China. Lih said that "There is no monolithically operating Great Firewall of China", noting that for users of various internet service providers in different locations in China—China Netcom in Beijing, China Telecom in Shanghai, and various providers in Anhui—the Chinese Wikipedia was blocked only in Anhui. Advocacy organization Reporters Without Borders praised Wikipedia's leaders for not self-censoring.

On 10 November 2006, Lih reported that the Chinese Wikipedia appeared to have been fully unblocked. Lih confirmed the full unblocking several days later and offered a partial analysis of the effects based on the rate of new account creation on the Chinese Wikipedia. Before the unblocking, 300–400 new accounts were created daily. In the four days after the unblocking, the rate of new registrations more than tripled to over 1,200 daily, making it the second fastest growing Wikipedia after the English version. Similarly, there were 75% more articles created in the week ending on 13 November than during the week before. On the same weekend that the Chinese Wikipedia passed the 100,000 article mark, Lih predicted that the second 100,000 would come quickly but that the existing body of Chinese Wikipedia users would have their hands full teaching the new users basic Wikipedia policies and norms.

On 16 November 2006, the Reuters news agency reported the main page of the Chinese Wikipedia could be displayed but not pages on some taboo political subjects, such as "4 June, [1989 protests]". However, subsequent reports suggested that both the Chinese and English versions had been reblocked the next day on 17 November. On 15 June 2007, access to non-political articles on the English Wikipedia was restored. On 6 September 2007, IDG News reported that the English Wikipedia was blocked again. On 2 April 2008, The Register reported that the blocks on the English and Chinese Wikipedias were lifted. This was confirmed by the BBC and came within the context of foreign journalists arriving in Beijing to report on the 2008 Summer Olympics and the International Olympic Committee's request for press freedom during the games. In September 2008, Jimmy Wales had a meeting with Cai Mingzhao, Vice Director of China's State Council Information Office. While no agreements were made, Wales believed that a channel of communication had been opened between Wikipedia's community and the PRC Government.

According to a report published in the American Economic Review in 2011, the blocking of the Chinese Wikipedia not only reduced the group size of its users but also decreased the unblocked users' contributions by 42.8% on average.

In 2012, both the Chinese and English Wikipedias were accessible in China except for political articles. If a Chinese IP attempted to access or search for a "sensitive" article, the IP would be blocked from visiting Wikipedia for between several minutes to up to an hour.

Chinese authorities started blocking access to the secure (HTTPS) version of the site on 31 May 2013. Although the non-secure (HTTP) version was still available, it was vulnerable to keyword filtering allowing individual articles to be selectively blocked. GreatFire urged Wikipedia and users to circumvent the block by accessing other IP addresses owned by Wikipedia with HTTPS. In 2013, after Jimmy Wales stated that Wikipedia will not tolerate "5 seconds" of censorship, Shen Yi, an Internet researcher at Fudan University in Shanghai said that while "Wikipedia is tough against the Chinese government, it may not necessarily be so grand when faced with US government or European justice systems' requirements to modify or delete articles or disclose information".

According to GreatFire, both the encrypted and unencrypted Chinese Wikipedia were blocked on 19 May 2015.

Since June 2015, all Wikipedias redirect HTTP requests to the corresponding HTTPS addresses, thereby making encryption mandatory for all users and rendering the site inaccessible in China. As a result, Chinese censors cannot see which specific pages an individual is viewing and therefore cannot block a specific subset of pages (such as Ai Weiwei, Liu Xiaobo or Tiananmen Square) as they did in past years.

Wales said he would fly to China to lobby the Chinese government to unlock the site within two weeks at the Leadership Energy Summit Asia 2015 in Kuala Lumpur on 2 December 2015. The government of the People's Republic of China completely blocked all language versions of the site again on 4 December. A large number of Chinese internet users complained about the block on social networks, although most of the complaints were deleted after a short period. However, it became possible to visit Wikipedia in other languages on 6 December in China again.

Wales met Lu Wei, the director of Cyberspace Administration of China on 17 December 2015 during the World Internet Conference held in Wuzhen, Zhejiang. Wales said that this was the first time they met and there was no consensus on specific issues but that the purpose of the meeting was for the two to "meet and know each other". Wales told Lu Wei how Wikipedia and Wikimedia work in the world and expressed hopes to meet Lu Wei and the Cyberspace Administration of China regularly in the future. When a reporter asked if he would order Wikipedia to hide some information to maintain stable operations in China, he responded "Never." Still, Wales' own words have been censored; he said that the improvements in machine translation might make it "no longer possible" for authorities to control flows of information in the future during a panel discussion. However, in the official translation, his statement was that such improvements will help governments to better analyze online communications.

On 23 April 2019, all versions of Wikipedia were blocked in China.

On 23 September 2020, Wikimedia's application for the status as an official observer at the World Intellectual Property Organization was rejected by the Chinese government because China's representative claimed that they had "spotted a large amount of content and disinformation in violation of [the] One China principle" on webpages affiliated with Wikimedia, and Wikimedia's Taiwan branch has been "carrying out political activities... which could undermine the state's sovereignty and territorial integrity".

On 24 October 2020, a Chinese citizen in Zhoushan, Zhejiang was penalized by the local police for "illegally visiting Wikipedia".

On 5 October 2021, the Chinese government rejected the Wikimedia Foundation's bid for observer status at the World Intellectual Property Organization again for the same reason in 2020.

On 13 September 2019, the Wikimedia Foundation banned seven Wikipedia users and removed administrator privileges from twelve users that were part of Wikimedians of Mainland China (WMC). Maggie Dennis, the foundation's vice present of community resilience and sustainability, said that there had been an yearlong investigation into "infiltration concerns". Dennis said, "we needed to act based on credible information that some members (not all) of that group [WMC] have harassed, intimidated, and threatened other members of our community, including in some cases physically harming others, in order to secure their own power and subvert the collaborative nature of our projects."

Iran 

In a November 2013 report published by the Center for Global Communication Studies of the University of Pennsylvania, researchers Collin Anderson and Nima Nazeri scanned 800,000 Persian-language Wikipedia articles and found that the Iranian government blocks 963 of these pages. According to the authors, "Censors repeatedly targeted Wikipedia pages about government rivals, minority religious beliefs, and criticisms of the state, officials, and the police. Just under half of the blocked Wiki-pages are biographies, including pages about individuals the authorities have allegedly detained or killed." Anderson said that Persian Wikipedia, as a microcosm of the Iranian internet, is a "useful place to uncover the types of online content forbidden and an excellent template to identify keyword blocking themes and filtering rules that apply across the greater internet." In May 2014, according to Mashable, the Iranian government blocked at least two pages on the Persian Wikipedia.

In 2015, the Wikipedia software migrated to HTTPS protocol, leaving the Iranian government with no choice but to either block it completely or not block it at all. Iran chose the latter. Wikimedia Commons was blocked during the first half of 2016, but the block has been lifted since then.
In 2013, Iran's Information and Communications Technology Minister said that an Iranian Wikipedia copy would be developed.  Tasnimnews close to Iranian Armed Forces accused Wikipedia of attempting espionage and being funded by Zionists.
According to AP during the COVID-19 pandemic access to Wikipedia was  disrupted in Iranian network.

Myanmar 
On 21 February 2021, following the military coup d'état, Myanmar blocked Wikipedia in all languages as part of the junta's censorship.

Pakistan 

For seven hours on 31 March 2006, the entire domain of Wikipedia.org was blocked in Pakistan because one article contained information pertaining to the controversial cartoons of Muhammad.

The English version of Wikipedia was blocked in Pakistan for several days in May 2010 during the controversy surrounding Everybody Draw Mohammed Day.

On 1 February 2023, the Pakistan Telecommunication Authority (PTA) degraded Wikipedia services for 48 hours due to what it said was Wikipedia's failure to remove sacrilegious content. The PTA stated that Wikipedia services would be blocked if the content remained available. On 3 February, Pakistani authorities blocked access to Wikipedia. On 6 February 2023, the Pakistani prime minister, Shehbaz Sharif, ordered the PTA to immediately remove the ban on Wikipedia.

Russia 

Since the early 2010s, Russian Wikipedia and its editors have experienced numerous and increasing threats of nationwide blocks and country-wide enforcement of blacklisting by the Russian government, as well as several attempts to censor pages, spread propaganda, and disinform, more recently during the 2014 Russo-Ukrainian war in the Donbas region and the current 2022 Russo-Ukrainian War.

On 5 April 2013, the Federal Service for Supervision of Communications, Information Technology and Mass Media (better known as Roskomnadzor) confirmed that Wikipedia was blacklisted, stating that it had been "for a long time. I don't know why it's only now that they've woken up". The same day, Roskomnadzor ordered the Russian Wikipedia to remove the article "Cannabis smoking", or else they would block the entirety of Wikipedia in Russia. Internet censorship became more common after a new law was passed around November 2013, allowing the government to block content deemed illegal or harmful to children.

On 18 August 2015, Roskomnadzor instructed Russian Wikipedia administrators to remove an article about charas (Чарас), a type of cannabis, by 21 August 2015 or else they would block Wikipedia (which they executed to a limited extent on 25 August). The article was found by a Russian provincial court to contain a detailed description to make a narcotic, deeming it prohibited information. Roskomnadzor explained that "insofar as Wikipedia has decided to function on the basis of https, which doesn't allow restricting to individual pages on its site, the entire website would be blocked" if they did not comply. In response to the impending block, the director of NP Wikimedia RU Vladimir Medeyko argued that the article had already been promptly and adequately rewritten to remove the controversial points and satisfy the order, using scientific articles and UN documents, and also attempted to preserve the text by transferring it to the article "Hashish (:ru:Гашиш)". Wikipedia representatives said if access was restricted, they would file a complaint to the prosecutor's office against Roskomnadzor and appeal the decision. Anticipating the ban, the Russian Wikipedia published a resource titled "What to do if Wikipedia was blocked". On 24 August, Roskomnadzor instructed Russian internet providers to block Wikipedia. By the night of 25 August, around 10–20% of Russian users had issues with accessing Wikipedia with access varying between regions and devices used. Also on the same date, the charas article was removed from the registry of banned sites. Roskomnadzor explained that they had "been informed by the Federal Drug Control Service that sufficient edits were made that met the conditions of court order".

In February and March 2022, in the first week following the Russian invasion of Ukraine and breakout of the Russo-Ukrainian War, Russian Wikipedia editors warned their readers and fellow editors of several, reiterated attempts by the Putin-led Russian government of political censorship, Internet propaganda, disinformation attacks, and disruptive editing towards an article listing of Russian military casualties as well as Ukrainian civilians and children due to the ongoing war. On 1 March 2022, Roskomnadzor threatened to block access to the Russian Wikipedia in Russia over the Russian-language article Russian invasion of Ukraine in 2022. Roskomnadzor claimed that the article contains "illegally distributed information", including "reports about numerous casualties among service personnel of the Russian Federation and also the civilian population of Ukraine, including children."

On 31 March 2022, Russian media censorship agency Roskomnadzor threatened to fine Wikipedia up to 4 million rubles (about $49,000) if it did not delete information about the 2022 Russian invasion of Ukraine that is "misinforming" Russians.

In April–May 2022, the Russian authorities put several Wikipedia articles on their list of forbidden sites. The list included the articles 2022 Russian invasion of Ukraine, Rashism, several articles in Russian Wikipedia devoted to the military action and war crimes during the Russian invasion of Ukraine, and 2 sections of the Russian article about Vladimir Putin.

On 20 July 2022, due to the refusal of Wikipedia to remove the articles about the Russian-Ukrainian war, Roskomnadzor ordered search engines to mark Wikipedia as a violator of Russian laws.

On 1 November 2022, the Wikimedia Foundation was fined 2 million rubles by a Russian court for not deleting two articles on Russian Wikipedia.

Saudi Arabia 

On 11 July 2006 the Saudi government blocked access to Wikipedia and Google Translate for what it said was sexual and politically sensitive content. Google Translate was being used to bypass the filters on the blocked sites by translating them. Though Wikipedia is not blocked currently, specific pages on Wikipedia were reported to be censored by Saudi Arabia in 2011, such as one page discussing the theory of evolution. Encrypted connections denoted by "HTTPS" made censorship more difficult for these pages and today there is no evidence that individual pages are still being blocked.

In September 2020, two Wikipedia volunteer administrators were arrested on the same day: Osama Khalid was sentenced to 32 years in prison while Ziyad al-Sofiani was sentenced to eight years, according to Smex, a Lebanese NGO to advance self-regulating information societies in the Arab-speaking world, and Democracy for the Arab World Now. A subsequent investigation by the Wikimedia Foundation identified 16 users who seemed to routinely engage in conflict-of-interest editing—reportedly including spying for the Saudi government.

Syria 

Access to the Arabic Wikipedia was blocked in Syria between 30 April 2008 and 13 February 2009, although other language editions remained accessible.

Tunisia 

The Wikipedia website was inaccessible from Tunisia between 23 and 27 November 2006.

Turkey 

In the early hours of 29 April 2017, monitoring group Turkey Blocks identified loss of access to all language editions of Wikipedia throughout Turkey. The block came after Turkish authorities demanded Wikipedia "remove content by writers supporting terror and of linking Turkey to terror groups"; a demand for which the government stated that it did not receive a satisfactory response.

Before, Turkey had only censored specific articles on Turkish Wikipedia, such as  "Kadın üreme organları" (vulva), "insan penisi" (human penis), "2015 Türkiye genel seçim anketleri" (2015 Turkey general election polls) "vajina" (vagina) and "testis torbası" (scrotum). There was no court decision for this censorship. One Turkish internet provider, TTNET, speculated that Wikipedia was broken. Katherine Maher from the Wikimedia Foundation said this did not reflect the truth.

In December 2019, the Constitutional Court of Turkey ruled that the two and a half-year block was unconstitutional. On 15 January 2020, it was reported to the Wikimedia Foundation that access to the website was being restored.

Uzbekistan 

The entirety of Wikipedia was briefly blocked twice in Uzbekistan, in 2007 and 2008. Blocking of the Uzbek Wikipedia caught the attention of the international press in late February 2012. Internet users in Uzbekistan trying to access Uzbek-language pages were redirected to MSN. Users in Uzbekistan could easily open Wikipedia articles in other languages. Only Uzbek-language articles were blocked. Today Uzbek users can access Uzbek-language articles without problems. In 2022 Uzbek government cohosted the WikiStipendiya article creation editathon with the Uzbek community.

Venezuela 

In the evening of 12 January 2019, the NetBlocks internet observatory had collected technical evidence of the blocking of all editions of Wikipedia in Venezuela. The restrictions were being implemented by CANTV, the largest telecommunications provider in the country. NetBlocks identified a major network disruption affecting the telecommunications infrastructure, which coincided with other restrictions affecting Venezuelans' ability to communicate and access information during the previous 24 hours. The collected data also showed that a number of local websites had been recently restricted, indicating that recent political instability could be the underlying cause for what may be a tightening regime of internet control.

Single-article disputes

Types of disputes 
Individual articles can be disputed or blocked by a country for allegedly violating a range of laws from revealing the location of a secret military installation (see France below), defamation or misinformation laws (see Germany below), or a judgment that an image in an article was pornographic (see UK below).

Examples by country

Australia 
In 2018, County Court of Victoria chief judge Peter Kidd placed a non-publication order on all of the evidence and the verdict in a trial of Australian Cardinal George Pell. The suppression order applied "in all Australian states and territories" and "on any website or other electronic or broadcast format accessible within Australia". This clearly included Wikipedia, which was cited but not charged.

France 

In April 2013, a Wikipedia article describing the Pierre-sur-Haute military radio station attracted attention from the French interior intelligence agency DCRI. The agency attempted to have the article about the facility removed from the French Wikipedia. The DCRI pressured Rémi Mathis, a volunteer administrator of the French Wikipedia and resident of France, into deleting the article. The Wikimedia Foundation asked the DCRI which parts of the article were causing a problem, noting that the article closely reflected information in a 2004 documentary made by Télévision Loire 7, a French local television station, which is freely available online. The DCRI refused to give these details, and repeated its demand for deletion of the article. According to a statement issued by Wikimédia France on 6 April 2013:

Later, the article was restored by another Wikipedia contributor who lived outside France, in Switzerland. As a result of the controversy, the article became the most read page on the French Wikipedia, with over 120,000-page views during the weekend of 6–7 April 2013. It was translated into multiple other languages. The French newspaper 20 minutes, Ars Technica, and a posting on Slashdot, noted it as an example of the Streisand effect in action. The French Ministry of the Interior told the Agence France-Presse (AFP) that it did not wish to comment on the incident.

According to a judicial source quoted in an AFP story on 8 April, the article's deletion "was performed as part of a preliminary inquiry" led by the "anti-terrorist section of the Paris prosecutor's office" on the grounds that the French language Wikipedia article compromised "classified material related to the chain of transmission for nuclear launch orders".

Following the incident, Télévision Loire 7 said that it expected that the DCRI would request that it take down the original 2004 report on which the Wikipedia article was based, though it had been filmed and broadcast with the full cooperation of the French armed forces. The National Union of Police Commissioners suggested that the next step would be for the judiciary to order French Internet service providers to block access to the Wikipedia article. However, the France-based NGO Reporters Without Borders criticised the DCRI's actions as "a bad precedent". The organisation's spokesperson told Le Point that, "if the institution considers that secret defence information has been released, it has every opportunity to be recognised by the courts in arguing and clarifying its application. It is then up to the judge, the protector of fundamental freedoms, to assess the reality and extent of military secrecy." The spokesperson noted that the information contained in the article had come from a documentary that had previously been filmed and distributed with the cooperation of the army, and that the hosts and intermediaries should not be held responsible.

Germany 
In one case, Wikipedia.de (an Internet domain run by Wikimedia Deutschland) was prohibited from pointing to the actual Wikipedia content. The court order was a temporary injunction in a case filed by politician Lutz Heilmann over claims regarding his past involvement with the former German Democratic Republic's intelligence service Stasi.

United Kingdom 

In December 2008, the Internet Watch Foundation, a UK-based non-government organization, added the Wikipedia article Virgin Killer to its internet blacklist due to the album cover's image and the illegality of child pornography in that country; the image had been assessed by IWF as being the lowest level of legal concern: "erotic posing with no sexual activity". As a result, people using many major UK ISPs were blocked from viewing the entire article by the Cleanfeed system, and a large part of the UK was blocked from editing Wikipedia owing to the means used by the IWF to block the image. Following discussion, representations by the Wikimedia Foundation, and public complaints, the IWF reversed their decision three days later, and confirmed that in future they would not block copies of the same image that were hosted overseas.

See also 
 Censorship in North Korea
 
 Deletionism and inclusionism in Wikipedia
 Ideological bias on Wikipedia
 
 List of people imprisoned for editing Wikipedia

References

External links 

 Full Text: Cui Objects to Wikipedia Shutdown (translated by The Washington Post Beijing Bureau)
 Full Text: Shi's Defense of Wikipedia (translated by The Washington Post Beijing Bureau)

Wikipedia
Wikipedia